Timofey Yemelyanov (born 14 June 1993) is a Kazakhstani canoeist. He competed in the men's C-2 1000 metres event at the 2020 Summer Olympics.

References

External links
 

1993 births
Living people
Kazakhstani male canoeists
Olympic canoeists of Kazakhstan
Canoeists at the 2020 Summer Olympics
People from Shymkent
Canoeists at the 2010 Summer Youth Olympics
Asian Games medalists in canoeing
Canoeists at the 2010 Asian Games
Canoeists at the 2014 Asian Games
Canoeists at the 2018 Asian Games
Medalists at the 2010 Asian Games
Medalists at the 2014 Asian Games
Medalists at the 2018 Asian Games
Asian Games gold medalists for Kazakhstan
Asian Games silver medalists for Kazakhstan
Asian Games bronze medalists for Kazakhstan